Tibor Fazekas (9 June 1892 – 11 May 1982) was a Hungarian water polo player who had a total of 3 olympic appearances. He was born and died in Budapest.

References

External links
profile 

1892 births
1982 deaths
Hungarian male water polo players
Water polo players at the 1912 Summer Olympics
Water polo players at the 1924 Summer Olympics
Olympic water polo players of Hungary
Water polo players from Budapest